The Murininae are a subfamily of bats in the family Vespertilionidae. They include the tube-nosed bats and hairy-winged bats in the genera Murina, Harpiola, and Harpiocephalus.

Subfamily Murininae
Genus Murina – tube-nosed insectivorous bats
Bronze tube-nosed bat, M. aenea
Little tube-nosed bat, M. aurata
Beelzebub's tube-nosed bat, M. beelzebub
Bicolored tube-nosed bat, M. bicolor
Ashy-gray tube-nosed bat, M. cineracea
Round-eared tube-nosed bat, M. cyclotis
Elery's tube-nosed bat, M. eleryi
Flute-nosed bat, M. florium
Dusky tube-nosed bat, M. fusca
Slender tube-nosed bat, M. gracilis
Da Lat tube-nosed-bat Murina harpioloides
Harrison's tube-nosed bat, M. harrisoni
Hilgendorf's tube-nosed bat, M. hilgendorfi
Hkakabo Razi tube-nosed bat, M. hkakaboraziensis
Hutton's tube-nosed bat, M. huttoni
Greater tube-nosed bat, M. leucogaster
Taiwan tube-nosed bat, M. puta
Murina recondita
Gilded tube-nosed bat, M. rozendaali
Ryukyu tube-nosed bat, M. ryukyuana
Brown tube-nosed bat, M. suilla
Gloomy tube-nosed bat, M. tenebrosa
Scully's tube-nosed bat, M. tubinaris
Ussuri tube-nosed bat, M. ussuriensis
Walston's tube-nosed bat, M. walstoni
Genus Harpiola
Peters's tube-nosed bat, H. (Murina) grisea
Formosan golden tube-nosed bat Harpiola isodon
Genus Harpiocephalus – hairy-winged bats
Hairy-winged bat, H. harpia
Greater hairy-winged bat, H. mordax

References

 
Mammal subfamilies
Taxa named by Gerrit Smith Miller Jr.